Grayslake Central High School (also known as Grayslake Central or GCHS) is a public four-year high school located in Grayslake, Illinois and is part of Grayslake Community High School District 127. Founded in 1946, the school services the Chicago suburbs of Grayslake, Hainesville, and parts of Round Lake. The school's mascot is the Ram. Sender schools include Park School Campus, Grayslake Middle School, Woodland Middle School, Fremont Middle School, Highland Middle School, St. Gilbert Catholic School, and Prairie Crossing Charter School.

History 
Grayslake Central High School, originally known as Grayslake Community High School, opened for the first time in 1946 at 400 Lake Street, in downtown Grayslake, Illinois.  When the school opened, it was fairly small, consisting of one gymnasium, art studios, culinary art studios, classrooms, and a small cafeteria. In the years following, the campus was expanded to include a smaller auxiliary gymnasium, new district offices combined with an Instructional Media Center, a small theater, more classrooms in the late 90s, woodworking and metalworking facilities, choir and band facilities, a new, larger theater, and a field house. Due to a quickly rising student body resulting in the overcrowding of classes and lunch periods, the school district voted on a number of solutions such as the construction of another addition, or building an entirely separate campus. In the end, the latter was chosen and Grayslake North High School opened as a freshman campus for the 2004–2005 school year and continued as such until the 2007–2008 school year when all students living north of Washington Street relocated to the new campus.

Administration 
The school's principal is Daniel J. Landry. The district superintendent is Dr. Mikkel Storaasli.

Academics

Accolades 
D127 was recognized in 2017 as being the 17th best school district in Illinois by Niche, along with the 18th best high school in Illinois by The Washington Post. The school has received Financial Recognition Status by the Illinois State Board of Education for 13 years, this being the highest financial recognition offered by the Illinois State Board of Education. The school is also recognized as a member of The College Board and offers a multitude of Advanced Placement courses. In 2017, the school had 78 AP Scholar Recognitions, 25 AP Scholars with Honor, 90 Scholars with Distinction, and 15 National AP Scholars.

Description 
As of 2019–20 there were 344 seniors, 320 juniors, 351 sophomores, and 344 freshmen.

Athletics 
The school offers 53 teams and clubs students can participate in. The school also offers an intramural sports program that culminates in a Staff vs. Student Basketball Game. 

The Rams have won four state championships:

Competitive Cheerleading 
 2018-19 M

Cross Country (boys) 
 2015-16 2A

Cross Country (girls) 
 2021-22 2A
 2022-23 2A

Notable alumni 
 Adolf Benca (1977), painter
 Melinda Bush (1974), member of the Illinois Senate of the 31st district
 Melvin Gordon, professional football player and Super Bowl champion for the Kansas City Chiefs of the National Football League. Gordon attended Grayslake Central for one semester before transferring to Mary D. Bradford High School in Kenosha, Wisconsin
 Jay Hook (1955), former Major League Baseball player for the New York Mets and Cincinnati Reds
 Jo Jorgensen (1975), 2020 presidential nominee for the Libertarian Party.
 Sam Loeffler (1993) and Pete Loeffler (1995), founders of rock band Chevelle 
 Ninja (gamer) (2009), Twitch streamer, YouTuber, and professional gamer
 Margaret Mary Ray (1970), American woman charged repeatedly with celebrity stalking

References

External links
 
 District website

1946 establishments in Illinois
Educational institutions established in 1946
Public high schools in Illinois
Schools in Lake County, Illinois